The Mesoamerican language area is a sprachbund containing many of the languages natively spoken in the cultural area of Mesoamerica. This sprachbund is defined by an array of syntactic, lexical and phonological traits as well as a number of ethnolinguistic traits found in the languages of Mesoamerica, which belong to a number of language families, such as Uto-Aztecan, Mayan, Totonacan, Oto-Manguean and Mixe–Zoque languages as well as some language isolates and unclassified languages known to the region.

History of Mesoamerican areal linguistics
The similarities noted between many of the languages of Mesoamerica have led linguistic scholars to propose the constitution of a sprachbund, from as early as 1959. The proposal was not consolidated until 1986, however, when Lyle Campbell, Terrence Kaufman and Thomas Smith-Stark employed a rigid linguistic analysis to demonstrate that the similarities between a number of languages were indeed considerable, with the conclusion that their origins were very likely caused by diffusion rather than inheritance, the standard criteria for defining a sprachbund.

In their 1986 paper "Meso-America as a Linguistic Area" the above authors explored several proposed areal features of which they discarded most as being weakly attested, possibly by chance or inheritance or not confined to the Mesoamerican region. However, five traits in particular were shown to be widely attested among the languages, with boundaries coinciding with that of the Mesoamerican region and having a probable origin through diffusion. They then compared the five traits with the traits defining other language areas considered to be well-established, like the Mainland Southeast Asia linguistic area and Balkan language area. They concluded that by comparison the proposed Mesoamerican language area could indeed be considered a well-founded area: arguably "among the very strongest that are known" (Campbell, Kaufman & Smith-Stark. 1986 p. 556).

They also argued that some of the discarded traits might also be taken into consideration as strengthening the proposal, but they were not sufficient by themselves to act as foundation and other well-documented traits of a more ethnolinguistic character might not be considerable as traits that are linguistic but cultural.

Traits defining the Mesoamerican language area

The following is a brief description of the linguistic traits considered by Campbell, Kaufman and Smith-Stark as defining the Mesoamerican language area.

Nominal possession
Many of the Mesoamerican languages show a particular kind of construction for possession of nominals. The commonly found construction is "his noun1 noun2" meaning "noun2's noun1" ("his" often is a prefix in this construction). For example, in the Kʼicheʼ language, a Mayan language,  "the man's dog" literally means "his-dog the man". The similar construction in Nahuatl would be .

Relational nouns

Another trait shared by nearly all Mesoamerican languages is relational nouns. Relational nouns are used to express spatial and other relations, much like prepositions in most Indo-European languages but composed of a noun and possessive affixes.

For example in Pipil (Uto-Aztecan):

nu-wa:n "with me" (nu- means "my")
mu-wa:n "with you" (mu- means "yours")
i-wa:n  "with her" (i- means "his/her/its")

Or in Mam (Mayan):
n-wits-a "on me" (n- means "my")
t-wits  "on her" (t- means "his/her/its").

Pied-piping with inversion

Pied-piping with inversion is a special word order found in wh-questions.  It appears to be found in all Mesoamerican languages, but is rare outside Mesoamerica.

Vigesimal numeral system

All the languages of Mesoamerica have vigesimal, or base twenty numeral systems. This system has also spread to some languages just outside the Mesoamerican cultural area.

Non-verb-final syntax and absence of switch-reference
No language with verb-final basic word order is attested in Mesoamerica even though most of the languages bordering on Mesoamerica are verb final (SOV). Also no languages with switch reference are attested in Mesoamerica, but this is supposed by Campbell, Kaufman and Smith-Stark to be a secondary effect of the Mesoamerican languages not being verb final.

Widespread semantic calques

A strong evidence of diffusion throughout Mesoamerica is provided by a number of semantic calques widely found throughout the area.

For example, in many Mesoamerican languages the words for specific objects are constructed by compounding two different stems, and in many cases these two stems are semantically identical although linguistically unrelated.

Among these calques are:
leg-head meaning "knee"
deer-snake meaning "boa constrictor"
stone-ash meaning "limestone"
hand-neck meaning "wrist"
bird-stone meaning "egg"
blood-road meaning "vein"
grind-stone meaning "molar"
mouth meaning "edge"
god-excrement or sun-excrement meaning "precious metal"
hand-mother meaning "thumb"
water-mountain meaning "town"

Other traits
Other traits found in Mesoamerican languages, but not found by Campbell, Kaufman and Smith-Stark to be prominent enough to be conclusive for the proposal of the language area are:
incorporation of bodypart nouns into verbs
derivation of locative case forms from bodypart nouns
whistled languages
grammatical indication of inalienable possession
numeral classifiers
grammatical polite forms for second person addressees
a special ritual language register

See also
Linguistic areas of the Americas
Mesoamerica
Areal linguistics
Mesoamerican languages

Notes

References
Lyle Campbell, Terrence Kaufman & Thomas Smith-Stark. 1986. Meso-America as a linguistic area. In: Language 62, No. 3: 530-558
Thomas C. Smith-Stark. 1994. Mesoamerican calques. I: Carolyn J. MacKay & Verónica Vázquez. Investigaciones lingüisticas en Mesoamérica. Mexico: Universidad Nacional Autónoma de México: 15–50.
Lourdes de Léon and Stephen C. Levinson. 1992. Spatial Description in Mesoamerican Languages. Introduction. Zeitschrift für Phonetik, Sprachwissenschaft und Kommunikationsforschung 45:527-29.
Brown, Penelope and Stephen C. Levinson. 1992. "Left" and "Right" in Tenejapa: Investigating a Linguistic and Conceptual Gap. In Léon, Lourdes de and Stephen C. Levinson. 590–611.
Levy, Paulette. 1992. Body Part Prefixes in Papantla Totonac. In Lourdes de Léon and Stephen C. Levinson: 530-542
Veerman-Leichsenring, Annette. 1992. Body Part Terms occurring in Popolocan Verbs. In Lourdes de Léon and Stephen C. Levinson: 562-569
De Léon, Lourdes. 1992. Body Parts and Location in Tzotzil: Ongoing Grammaticalization. In Lourdes de Léon and Stephen C. Levinson. 570–589.
Haviland, John B. 1992. Seated and Settled: Tzotzil Verbs of the Body.  In Lourdes de Léon and Stephen C. Levinson. 543–561.	
Lehmann, Christian. 1992. Yukatekische lokale Relatoren in typologischer Perspektive. In Lourdes de Léon and Stephen C. Levinson. 626–641.
Goldap, Christel. 1992. Morphology and semantics of Yucatec Space Relators. In Lourdes de Léon and Stephen C. Levinson. 612-625
Sherzer Joel. 1976. Areal Linguistics in North America 64 Native Languages of America vol 1 Sebeok, T, ed
Suaréz, Jorge A. 1983. The Mesoamerican Indian Languages (Cambridge Language Surveys), Cambridge: Cambridge University Press
Yasugi, Yoshiho. 1995. Native Middle American languages: an areal-typological perspective. Osaka: National Museum of Ethnology.

 
Sprachbund
Indigenous languages of Central America
Indigenous languages of North America